In geometry, an apeirogonal prism or infinite prism is the arithmetic limit of the family of prisms; it can be considered an infinite polyhedron or a tiling of the plane.

Thorold Gosset called it a 2-dimensional semi-check, like a single row of a checkerboard.

If the sides are squares, it is a uniform tiling. If colored with two sets of alternating squares it is still uniform.

Related tilings and polyhedra 
The apeirogonal tiling is the arithmetic limit of the family of prisms t{2, p} or p.4.4, as p tends to infinity, thereby turning the prism into a Euclidean tiling.

An alternation operation can create an apeirogonal antiprism composed of three triangles and one apeirogon at each vertex.
 

Similarly to the uniform polyhedra and the uniform tilings, eight uniform tilings may be based from the regular apeirogonal tiling. The rectified and cantellated forms are duplicated, and as two times infinity is also infinity, the truncated and omnitruncated forms are also duplicated, therefore reducing the number of unique forms to four: the apeirogonal tiling, the apeirogonal hosohedron, the apeirogonal prism, and the apeirogonal antiprism.

Notes

References 
 T. Gosset: On the Regular and Semi-Regular Figures in Space of n Dimensions, Messenger of Mathematics, Macmillan, 1900
 
 The Symmetries of Things 2008, John H. Conway, Heidi Burgiel, Chaim Goodman-Strass, 

Apeirogonal tilings
Euclidean tilings
Isogonal tilings
Prismatoid polyhedra